Roberto Lombraña Hompanera (born 13 November 1975) is a Spanish retired footballer who played as a midfielder.

Football career
Born in Durango, Biscay, Lombraña spent the vast majority of his 17-year senior career in Segunda División B. His professional input consisted of 66 games and one goal in Segunda División at the service of SD Eibar, being relegated at the end of the 2008–09 season.

Lombraña's younger brother, Javier (born 1977), was also a footballer. A left back, he only competed in the third level or lower.

References

External links

1975 births
Living people
People from Durango, Biscay
Spanish footballers
Footballers from the Basque Country (autonomous community)
Association football midfielders
Segunda División players
Segunda División B players
Tercera División players
SD Lemona footballers
Barakaldo CF footballers
Logroñés CF footballers
Real Unión footballers
SD Eibar footballers
Sportspeople from Biscay